Elaphrus parviceps is a species of ground beetle in the subfamily Elaphrinae. It was described by Van Dyke in 1925.

References

Elaphrinae
Beetles described in 1925